Telemaco, ossia L'isola di Circe (Telemachus, or Circe's Island) is an operatic dramma per musica in two acts by Christoph Willibald Gluck. The Italian libretto was written by Marco Coltellini after Carlo Sigismondo Capece's libretto for Scarlatti's 1718 opera Telemaco.

The opera was written for the wedding of the Emperor (to be) Joseph II and Princess Maria Josepha of Bavaria.

Performance history

The first performance was at the Burgtheater in Vienna on 30 January 1765.

Roles

References
Notes

Sources
Hayes, Jeremy: "Telemaco" in The New Grove Dictionary of Opera, ed. Stanley Sadie (London, 1992) 
Moratto, Lucia: Fra tradizione e riforma: il Telemaco di Coltellini e Gluck, pp. 30–39, rodoni.ch,

External links

Operas by Christoph Willibald Gluck
Operas based on classical mythology
Operas based on the Odyssey
Italian-language operas
Operas
1765 operas
Opera world premieres at the Burgtheater
Works based on Les Aventures de Télémaque